Expedition to the Chesapeake may refer to

 Expedition to the Chesapeake (1777), a British military expedition during the American War of Independence, under the command of Lord William Howe
 Expedition to the Chesapeake (1813), a British military expedition during the War of 1812